Angoseseli is a genus of flowering plants in the family Apiaceae. Its only species is Angoseseli mossamedensis.

References 

Monotypic Apiaceae genera
Apiaceae